The 2002–03 Texas Southern Tigers basketball team represented Texas Southern University during the 2002–03 NCAA Division I men's basketball season. The Tigers, led by second year head coach Ronnie Courtney, played their home games at the Health and Physical Education Arena and were members of the Southwestern Athletic Conference. They finished the season 18–13, 11–7 in SWAC play to finish in third place. They were champions of the SWAC tournament to earn an automatic bid to the NCAA tournament where they lost the Play-in game to UNC Asheville.

Roster

Schedule and results

|-
!colspan=9 style=| Regular season

|-
!colspan=9 style=| SWAC tournament

|-
!colspan=9 style=| NCAA tournament

References

Texas Southern Tigers basketball seasons
Texas Southern
Texas Southern
Texas Southern Tigers basketball
Texas Southern Tigers basketball